= Kabootarbaazi =

Kabootarbaazi is a traditional Indian sport and cultural practice of keeping and racing pigeons. Dating back to ancient times, the tradition became prominent in Delhi during the Mughal Empire. In Kabootarbaazi, pigeons are raced against each other. The sport reached its zenith under Emperor Jahangir, who brought expert pigeon trainers to Delhi. The sport is male-dominated.
